Dikme is a small human settlement in Yahyalı district, Kayseri Province, Turkey with a Warm-summer Mediterranean (Csb) Köppen climate classification.

References 

Yahyalı District
Populated places in Kayseri Province